Parbhu Singh (born 14 August 1916) is an Indian politician. He was a Member of Parliament, representing Haryana in the Rajya Sabha the upper house of India's Parliament as a member of the  Janata Party.

References

1916 births
Possibly living people
Janata Party politicians
Rajya Sabha members from Haryana